Jacklyn "Jackie" Frank is an Antiguan and Barbudan politician as well as a Barbudan social worker. She was the Chairperson of the Barbuda Council.

Political career 
Jacklyn Frank was first elected to the council in 2017, getting 475 votes for the Barbuda People's Movement. 
She replaced Calsey Beazer-Joseph who headed the Barbuda Council one year, and has become the third ever female to serve as Chairperson of the Barbuda Council.

She is quoted saying:

References 

Living people
Year of birth missing (living people)
Chairs of the Barbuda Council
Members of the Barbuda Council
Barbuda Council
Antigua and Barbuda women in politics
Barbuda People's Movement politicians
People from Barbuda